Senator Jackson may refer to:

Members of the United States Senate
Andrew Jackson (1767–1845), U.S. Senator from Tennessee from 1823 to 1825
Howell Edmunds Jackson (1832–1895), U.S. Senator from Tennessee from 1881 to 1886
James Jackson (Georgia politician) (1757–1806), U.S. Senator from Georgia from 1793 to 1795 and from 1801 to 1806
Jesse Jackson (born 1941), shadow U.S. Senator for the District of Columbia from 1991 to 1997
Samuel D. Jackson (1895–1951), U.S. Senator from Indiana in 1944
William Purnell Jackson (1868–1939), U.S. State Senator from Maryland from 1912 to 1914

United States state senate members
Alvin B. Jackson (fl. 2000s–2010s), Utah State Senate
Bill Jackson (politician) (born 1932), Georgia State Senate
Claiborne Fox Jackson (1806–1862), Missouri State Senate
Clingan Jackson (1907–1997), Ohio State Senate
Darrell Jackson (politician) (born 1957), South Carolina State Senate
Douglas S. Jackson (born 1954), Tennessee State Senate
Ed Jackson (Tennessee politician) (born 1948), Tennessee State Senate
Gary Jackson (politician) (born 1950), Mississippi State Senate
George Jackson (Virginia politician) (1757–1831), Virginia State Senate
Hancock Lee Jackson (1796–1876), Missouri State Senate
Henry M. Jackson (1912–1983), Washington State Senate
Jack Jackson Jr. (fl. 2000s–2010s), Arizona State Senate
Jack Jackson Sr. (born 1933), Arizona State Senate
Jeff Jackson (politician) (born 1980s), North Carolina State Senate
Jonathan Jackson (Massachusetts politician) (1743–1810), Massachusetts State Senate
Joseph Webber Jackson (1796–1854), Georgia State Senate
Lester G. Jackson (fl. 1990s–2000s), Georgia State Senate
Lloyd G. Jackson (1918–2011), West Virginia State Senate
Lydia P. Jackson (born 1960), Louisiana State Senate
Mike Jackson (Texas politician) (born 1953), Texas State Senate
Morris Jackson (1918–2004), Ohio State Senate
Sampson Jackson (born 1953), Mississippi State Senate
Troy Jackson (politician) (born 1968), Maine State Senate
Verdell Jackson (born 1941), Montana State Senate
W. Brent Jackson (born 1957), North Carolina State Senate